Peski is the name of several inhabited localities in Russia.

Arkhangelsk Oblast
As of 2010, one rural locality in Arkhangelsk Oblast bears this name:
Peski, Arkhangelsk Oblast, a village in Pustoshinsky Selsoviet of Primorsky District

Bryansk Oblast
As of 2010, two rural localities in Bryansk Oblast bear this name:
Peski, Surazhsky District, Bryansk Oblast, a settlement in Ovchinsky Selsoviet of Surazhsky District
Peski, Unechsky District, Bryansk Oblast, a village in Pavlovsky Selsoviet of Unechsky District

Kaliningrad Oblast
As of 2010, two rural localities in Kaliningrad Oblast bear this name:
Peski, Ozyorsky District, Kaliningrad Oblast, a settlement in Krasnoyarsky Rural Okrug of Ozyorsky District
Peski, Polessky District, Kaliningrad Oblast, a settlement in Zalesovsky Rural Okrug of Polessky District

Kaluga Oblast
As of 2010, one rural locality in Kaluga Oblast bears this name:
Peski, Kaluga Oblast, a village in Peremyshlsky District

Kirov Oblast
As of 2010, four rural localities in Kirov Oblast bear this name:
Peski, Kiknursky District, Kirov Oblast, a village in Tsekeyevsky Rural Okrug of Kiknursky District
Peski, Podgorodny Rural Okrug, Orlovsky District, Kirov Oblast, a village in Podgorodny Rural Okrug of Orlovsky District
Peski, Slobodskoy District, Kirov Oblast, a village in Svetozarevsky Rural Okrug of Slobodskoy District

Kostroma Oblast
As of 2010, one rural locality in Kostroma Oblast bears this name:
Peski, Kostroma Oblast, a village in Klevantsovskoye Settlement of Ostrovsky District

Kurgan Oblast
As of 2010, three rural localities in Kurgan Oblast bear this name:
Peski, Dalmatovsky District, Kurgan Oblast, a selo in Peskovsky Selsoviet of Dalmatovsky District
Peski, Tselinny District, Kurgan Oblast, a selo in Vaskinsky Selsoviet of Tselinny District
Peski, Yurgamyshsky District, Kurgan Oblast, a selo in Peskovsky Selsoviet of Yurgamyshsky District

Kursk Oblast
As of 2010, two rural localities in Kursk Oblast bear this name:
Peski, Konyshyovsky District, Kursk Oblast, a village in Makaropetrovsky Selsoviet of Konyshyovsky District
Peski, Zheleznogorsky District, Kursk Oblast, a khutor in Mikhaylovsky Selsoviet of Zheleznogorsky District

Leningrad Oblast
As of 2010, five rural localities in Leningrad Oblast bear this name:
Peski, Lomonosovsky District, Leningrad Oblast, a village in Anninskoye Settlement Municipal Formation of Lomonosovsky District
Peski, Priozersky District, Leningrad Oblast, a logging depot settlement in Zaporozhskoye Settlement Municipal Formation of Priozersky District
Peski, Volkhovsky District, Leningrad Oblast, a village in Kiselninskoye Settlement Municipal Formation of Volkhovsky District
Peski, Vsevolozhsky District, Leningrad Oblast, a logging depot settlement under the administrative jurisdiction of Dubrovskoye Settlement Municipal Formation of Vsevolozhsky District
Peski, Vyborgsky District, Leningrad Oblast, a logging depot settlement in Polyanskoye Settlement Municipal Formation of Vyborgsky District

Moscow Oblast
As of 2010, five inhabited localities in Moscow Oblast bear this name.

Urban localities
Peski, Kolomensky District, Moscow Oblast, a work settlement in Kolomensky District

Rural localities
Peski, Dmitrovsky District, Moscow Oblast, a village in Gabovskoye Rural Settlement of Dmitrovsky District
Peski, Shakhovskoy District, Moscow Oblast, a village in Seredinskoye Rural Settlement of Shakhovskoy District
Peski, Shatursky District, Moscow Oblast, a selo in Dmitrovskoye Rural Settlement of Shatursky District
Peski, Zaraysky District, Moscow Oblast, a village in Strupnenskoye Rural Settlement of Zaraysky District

Nizhny Novgorod Oblast
As of 2010, two rural localities in Nizhny Novgorod Oblast bear this name:
Peski, Koverninsky District, Nizhny Novgorod Oblast, a village in Gavrilovsky Selsoviet of Koverninsky District
Peski, Pervomaysky District, Nizhny Novgorod Oblast, a settlement in Petrovsky Selsoviet of Pervomaysky District

Novgorod Oblast
As of 2010, four rural localities in Novgorod Oblast bear this name:
Peski, Demyansky District, Novgorod Oblast, a village in Pesotskoye Settlement of Demyansky District
Peski, Khvoyninsky District, Novgorod Oblast, a village in Borovskoye Settlement of Khvoyninsky District
Peski, Poddorsky District, Novgorod Oblast, a village in Poddorskoye Settlement of Poddorsky District
Peski, Shimsky District, Novgorod Oblast, a village in Utorgoshskoye Settlement of Shimsky District

Pskov Oblast
As of 2010, seven rural localities in Pskov Oblast bear this name:
Peski, Dedovichsky District, Pskov Oblast, a village in Dedovichsky District
Peski, Dnovsky District, Pskov Oblast, a village in Dnovsky District
Peski, Kunyinsky District, Pskov Oblast, a village in Kunyinsky District
Peski, Porkhovsky District, Pskov Oblast, a village in Porkhovsky District
Peski, Pskovsky District, Pskov Oblast, a village in Pskovsky District
Peski, Strugo-Krasnensky District, Pskov Oblast, a village in Strugo-Krasnensky District
Peski, Velikoluksky District, Pskov Oblast, a village in Velikoluksky District

Ryazan Oblast
As of 2010, one rural locality in Ryazan Oblast bears this name:
Peski, Ryazan Oblast, a settlement in Perkinsky Rural Okrug of Spassky District

Samara Oblast
As of 2010, one rural locality in Samara Oblast bears this name:
Peski, Samara Oblast, a selo in Stavropolsky District

Smolensk Oblast
As of 2010, two rural localities in Smolensk Oblast bear this name:
Peski, Gagarinsky District, Smolensk Oblast, a village in Gagarinskoye Rural Settlement of Gagarinsky District
Peski, Rudnyansky District, Smolensk Oblast, a village in Kruglovskoye Rural Settlement of Rudnyansky District

Tambov Oblast
As of 2010, one rural locality in Tambov Oblast bears this name:
Peski, Tambov Oblast, a settlement in Kulevatovsky Selsoviet of Sosnovsky District

Tver Oblast
As of 2010, five rural localities in Tver Oblast bear this name:
Peski, Belsky District, Tver Oblast, a village in Belsky District
Peski, Bezhetsky District, Tver Oblast, a village in Bezhetsky District
Peski, Ostashkovsky District, Tver Oblast, a village in Ostashkovsky District
Peski (Kushalino Rural Settlement), Rameshkovsky District, Tver Oblast, a village in Rameshkovsky District; municipally, a part of Kushalino Rural Settlement of that district
Peski (Vysokovo Rural Settlement), Rameshkovsky District, Tver Oblast, a village in Rameshkovsky District; municipally, a part of Vysokovo Rural Settlement of that district

Ulyanovsk Oblast
As of 2010, one rural locality in Ulyanovsk Oblast bears this name:
Peski, Ulyanovsk Oblast, a village under the administrative jurisdiction of Karsunsky Settlement Okrug of Karsunsky District

Vladimir Oblast
As of 2010, two rural localities in Vladimir Oblast bear this name:
Peski, Petushinsky District, Vladimir Oblast, a village in Petushinsky District
Peski, Vyaznikovsky District, Vladimir Oblast, a village in Vyaznikovsky District

Volgograd Oblast
As of 2010, one rural locality in Volgograd Oblast bears this name:
Peski, Volgograd Oblast, a settlement in Sovkhozsky Selsoviet of Nikolayevsky District

Vologda Oblast
As of 2010, three rural localities in Vologda Oblast bear this name:
Peski, Kirillovsky District, Vologda Oblast, a village in Sukhoverkhovsky Selsoviet of Kirillovsky District
Peski, Nyuksensky District, Vologda Oblast, a village in Igmassky Selsoviet of Nyuksensky District
Peski, Vologodsky District, Vologda Oblast, a village in Nefedovsky Selsoviet of Vologodsky District

Voronezh Oblast
As of 2010, four rural localities in Voronezh Oblast bear this name:
Peski, Novokhopyorsky District, Voronezh Oblast, a settlement in Kolenovskoye Rural Settlement of Novokhopyorsky District
Peski, Pavlovsky District, Voronezh Oblast, a selo in Peskovskoye Rural Settlement of Pavlovsky District
Peski, Petropavlovsky District, Voronezh Oblast, a selo in Peskovskoye Rural Settlement of Petropavlovsky District
Peski, Povorinsky District, Voronezh Oblast, a selo in Peskovskoye Rural Settlement of Povorinsky District

Yaroslavl Oblast
As of 2010, two rural localities in Yaroslavl Oblast bear this name:
Peski, Nekrasovsky District, Yaroslavl Oblast, a village in Diyevo-Gorodishchensky Rural Okrug of Nekrasovsky District
Peski, Pereslavsky District, Yaroslavl Oblast, a village in Lychensky Rural Okrug of Pereslavsky District

Zabaykalsky Krai
As of 2010, one rural locality in Zabaykalsky Krai bears this name:
Peski, Zabaykalsky Krai, a selo in Petrovsk-Zabaykalsky District

See also
 Pisky